Leptophytidae is a family of corals belonging to the order Alcyonacea.

Genera:
 Circularius McFadden & van Ofwegen, 2017
 Leptophyton van Ofwegen & Schleyer, 1997
 Porphyrophyton McFadden & van Ofwegen, 2017
 Tenerodus McFadden & van Ofwegen, 2017

References

Alcyoniina
Cnidarian families